René Château (27 June 1906 – 5 April 1970) was a French philosopher, poet and politician.

Château was born in Mouthiers-sur-Boëme.  He represented the Radical-Socialist Party Camille Pelletan in the Chamber of Deputies from 1936 to 1940.
In 1940 he voted in favour of granting the Cabinet presided by Marshal Philippe Pétain authority to draw up a new constitution, thereby effectively ending the French Third Republic and establishing Vichy France.

As a journalist, he worked with Marcel Déat and became editor of La France socialiste, which he used to denounce the three international institutions of "capitalism, bolshevism and Jewishness". Later, he joined the National Popular Rally (RNP), from which he was expelled in 1943.  In 1944 he was arrested and imprisoned as a Nazi collaborator, first by the "francs-tireurs" and later by the forces of liberation.  He later wrote an account of his captivity called L'Âge de Caïn (1947), published under the pseudonym of Jean-Pierre Abel.

References

1906 births
1970 deaths
People from Charente
Politicians from Nouvelle-Aquitaine
Radical-Socialist Party Camille Pelletan politicians
National Popular Rally politicians
Members of the 16th Chamber of Deputies of the French Third Republic
20th-century French poets
French male poets
20th-century French male writers
French male non-fiction writers
20th-century French philosophers